The 2001–02 Romanian Hockey League season was the 72nd season of the Romanian Hockey League. Seven teams participated in the league, and Steaua Bucuresti won the championship.

Regular season

Playoffs

Semifinals
CSA Steaua Bucuresti - Sportul Studențesc Bucharest (7-2, 15-1, 11-0)
Progym Gheorgheni - SC Miercurea Ciuc (3-7, 6-4, 8-1, 2-0)

3rd place
SC Miercurea Ciuc - Sportul Studențesc Bucharest (6-2, 4-2, 10-2)

Final
CSA Steaua Bucuresti - Progym Gheorgheni (8-2, 5-4, 4-0)

External links
Season on hockeyarchives.info

Romanian Hockey League seasons
Romanian
Rom